Keith Webster may refer to:

 Keith Webster (Canadian football) (born 1937), retired Canadian football player
 Keith Webster (English footballer) (born 1945), English former footballer